Przemysław Koperski (born 22 November 1974) is a Polish politician and lawyer. Former deputy mayor of Częstochowa (2010–2014).

Electoral history

References

1974 births
Living people
People from Opole
Democratic Left Alliance politicians
Members of the Polish Sejm 2019–2023